This is a listing of the albums and singles released by Motown girl group Martha and the Vandellas. Twelve of their singles reached the Billboard Top 40 singles chart in the US while 22 singles registered on the Top 40 of the US R&B chart, 2 of which went to #1 on the chart. Six of the singles were Top 10 pop singles while 10 were Top 10 R&B singles. Of all the songs they released, 25 of their singles were Hot 100 pop singles with 26 registering on the Hot 100 R&B singles chart.

Albums

Compilation albums

Live albums

Singles

Other charted songs

References

External links

 
 
Discographies of American artists
Rhythm and blues discographies
Pop music group discographies
Soul music discographies